Bonchon Chicken is a Dallas-based South Korean international fried chicken restaurant franchise. According to the company, Bonchon is a Korean word meaning "My Hometown".

History
The Bonchon Chicken restaurant began in 2002 in Busan, South Korea. The first location in the U.S. was in Fort Lee, New Jersey. It later spread to California, New York, Connecticut, Illinois, Pennsylvania, Maryland, Massachusetts, Minnesota, New Jersey, Virginia, North Carolina, Florida, Texas, Delaware and Washington state. The Korean fried chicken franchise currently operates in 21 states in the U.S. and 8 countries internationally.

Jinduk Seo is the founder of Bonchon Chicken and Flynn Dekker is currently the CEO.

In 2021, Bonchon moved its global headquarters to Dallas, Texas.

Locations

Asia
 South Korea: 1 sauce manufacturer 
 Cambodia: 12 stores
 Myanmar: 7 stores
 Philippines: 168 stores
 Singapore: 6 stores
 Thailand: 101 stores
 Vietnam: 7 stores

Ocenia
 Australia: 2 stores

Middle East
 Kuwait: 2 stores
 Bahrain: 2 stores

North America
  United States: 114 stores

See also
 List of chicken restaurants

References

External links
Bonchon.com
Bonchon NY Times Article

Restaurants in South Korea
Fast-food chains of South Korea
Poultry restaurants
Fast-food franchises
Restaurants established in 2002
South Korean companies established in 2002
Korean restaurants in the United States